is a subway station on the Karasuma Line in Minami-ku, Kyoto, Japan.  The station sits at the intersection of Kujō Street and Karasuma Street.  Kujō Station is one station south of Kyoto Station, the central hub of Kyoto. It was opened on 11 June 1988.

Lines
 Kyoto Municipal Subway
 Karasuma Line (Station Number: K12)

Layout
The station has one underground island platform with two tracks.

References

Railway stations in Kyoto Prefecture
Railway stations in Kyoto
Railway stations in Japan opened in 1988